Lee Chen-tan (born 29 January 1966) is a Taiwanese bobsledder. He competed in the two man and the four man events at the 1988 Winter Olympics.

References

1966 births
Living people
Taiwanese male bobsledders
Olympic bobsledders of Taiwan
Bobsledders at the 1988 Winter Olympics
Place of birth missing (living people)
20th-century Taiwanese people